Anne Stevens is a former Republican member of the Hawaii House of Representatives. Stevens was appointed in January 2006 to replace Galen Fox as the representative for the State's 23rd district, which includes Waikiki and Ala Moana on the island of Oahu.

Stevens unsuccessfully ran for election to the 23rd District seat in 2006 and 2008. She remains active in her community as the Chairperson for the Waikiki Neighborhood Board.

External links 
Anne Stevens Campaign Website

References 

Living people
Republican Party members of the Hawaii House of Representatives
Women state legislators in Hawaii
Year of birth missing (living people)
21st-century American women